Neopetraeus is a genus of gastropods belonging to the family Bulimulidae.

The species of this genus are found in Central and Southern America.

Species:

Neopetraeus altoperuvianus 
Neopetraeus arboriferus 
Neopetraeus atahualpa 
Neopetraeus binneyanus 
Neopetraeus camachoi 
Neopetraeus catamarcanus 
Neopetraeus cora 
Neopetraeus decussatus 
Neopetraeus excoriatus 
Neopetraeus filiolus 
Neopetraeus heterogyrus 
Neopetraeus lobbii 
Neopetraeus patasensis 
Neopetraeus platystomus 
Neopetraeus tessellatus 
Neopetraeus vadum

References

Gastropods